Ralph Earl Tamm (born March 11, 1966) is a former American football player. He was selected by the New York Jets in the ninth round of the 1988 NFL Draft.

Football career
Before attending West Chester University, Tamm graduated from Bensalem High School where he played football and competed in track and field.

A 6'4", 280 lb. guard from West Chester University, Tamm played in ten NFL seasons from 1990–1999 and was a member of two Super Bowl championship teams: the first from Super Bowl XXVI with the Washington Redskins, the other with the San Francisco 49ers in Super Bowl XXIX.  He served as a players' representative on the Board of Directors for each of the teams for which he played.

Post football career
Tamm is now an NFL player agent for Golden Peaks Sports and Entertainment where he represents NFL players with respect to their NFL contracts, marketing endeavors and personal appearances.  He is also involved in the horse breeding industry, as well as being a part-owner of the Kansas City Brigade of the Arena Football League.

References

External links
 Database Football
 Ralph's Golden Peak Page

1966 births
Living people
Players of American football from Philadelphia
Cleveland Browns players
Cincinnati Bengals players
Washington Redskins players
San Francisco 49ers players
Denver Broncos players
Kansas City Chiefs players
American sports agents
West Chester Golden Rams football players